Transmission (also known for sponsorship reasons as Transmission with T-Mobile) is a British television programme broadcast on Channel 4, offering live performances and interviews of famous music artists, that ran for three series between 2006 and 2007. It was usually shown late at night on a Friday as part of the 4music strand on Channel 4.

The programme was sponsored by mobile phone network T-Mobile. The first series aired in 2006 and came back for a second series in early 2007, then returned for a third series at the end of 2007.

The programme was presented by T4 presenter Steve Jones and former XFM presenter Lauren Laverne.

References

External links
Transmission with T-Mobile website
Transmission with T-Mobile at Channel4.com

2006 British television series debuts
British music television shows
Channel 4 original programming
2007 British television series endings